Simalio phaeocephalus is a species of spider of the genus Simalio. It is endemic to Sri Lanka.

See also 
 List of Clubionidae species

References

Clubionidae
Endemic fauna of Sri Lanka
Spiders of Asia
Spiders described in 1906